WTZT-CD, virtual and VHF digital channel 11, branded on-air as ZTV11, is a low-powered, Class A Cozi TV-affiliated television station licensed to Athens, Alabama, United States. Founded on November 2, 1988, the station is owned by Jamie Cooper and wife Gloria, both of whom also host a morning show on the station. Despite its status as a Class A broadcaster, the station can be seen on numerous cable systems in northern Alabama.

Cooper began his broadcasting career with the Huntsville City Schools ETV unit in 1974. Some years later, he began doing human interest features on the newscasts of Huntsville ABC affiliate WAAY-TV (channel 31) under the name "The Country Rover". This led to another show on the station in the early 1990s, WAAY Too Early, a comedy-variety program, which he co-hosted with then-weather anchor Gary Dobbs. Cooper later left to be on his own, first brokering the show, now titled Cooper and Company, to Huntsville's WAFF-TV (channel 48) and later Florence's WOWL-TV (channel 15; now WHDF). The current version on his station features a variety of music, comedy, sports reports, and cooking segments.

WTZT-CD carries a mix of programming consisting of sports, movies, children's shows, religious programs, classic television reruns, home improvement programs, and a few other variety programs. The station also airs Cooper's Country Rover reports from the 1980s, repackaged into an hour of episodes; sometimes other locally produced programs air on ZTV-11 also.

Before Cooper purchased the station, it was owned by Athens Broadcasting, along with WVNN and WZYP radio stations, both longtime properties of the Bill and Mary Dunnavant family.

External links 

TZT-CD
Cozi TV affiliates
Television channels and stations established in 1988
Low-power television stations in the United States